Toisen päivän iltana (‘The night of the second day’) is a 1982 album by Finnish gospel musician Jaakko Löytty. It was released by Kirjapaja on its just records label. It was later released as a CD by fg-naxos in 2003.

Original vinyl release
Words and music by Jaakko Löytty, arrangements by Jaakko Löytty and Heikki Silvennoinen.
Side one

Side two

J. Löyttyband
Teppo Nuorva — guitar, background vocals
Jaakko Knuutila — bass, background vocals
Heikki Impiö — tenor saxophone, keyboards, background vocals
Timo Harakka — flute, alto saxophone, background vocals
Kyösti Lampinen — drums, percussion
Jaakko Löytty— guitar, Oberheim, vocals

Friends
Ismo Kätkä — percussion, kalimba, background vocals (A5)
Heikki Silvennoinen — percussion, background vocals (A5)
Pekka Salminen — Oberheim (A2, B5), organ, (A5)

Production
Heikki Silvennoinen — producer, recording engineer
Markus Heikkerö — cover art

External links
Toisen päivän iltana in Discogs

Jaakko Löytty albums
1982 albums